The 6th Arkansas Cavalry Battalion (1861 – October 25, 1864) was a Confederate Army cavalry battalion during the American Civil War.

Battles 
During its brief existence, the 6th Battalion was assigned to Hardee's Division of the Confederate Central Army of Kentucky, and fought in the battles of Brownsville, Kentucky, November 20, 1861; Rowlett's Station, Kentucky, December 17, 1861; and Shiloh, Tennessee, April 6–7, 1862. As part of the 2nd Arkansas Cavalry Regiment, under Colonel William Ferguson Slemons, the former 6th Battalion troops would go on to establish an impressive record under General Nathan Bedford Forrest. The unit served in the Army of the West and the Department of Mississippi and East Louisiana, and took an active part in the Battles of Iuka, Corinth, and Hatchie Bridge. In 1864, the regiment was transferred to the Trans-Mississippi Army and participated in fought in Arkansas, Missouri and Kansas. The regiment was assigned to W.A. Crawford's, J.C. Wright's, and W.F. Slemon's Brigade in the Trans-Mississippi Department. After fighting at the Battle of Poison Spring, the regiment participated in Price's Missouri Expedition.

Surrender 
The 2nd Arkansas Cavalry Regiment was captured at the Battle of Mine Creek on October 25, 1864, and apparently was never exchanged or reformed.

References

External links 
Edward G. Gerdes Civil War Home Page
The Encyclopedia of Arkansas History and Culture
The War of the Rebellion: a Compilation of the Official Records of the Union and Confederate Armies
The Arkansas History Commission, State Archives, Civil War in Arkansas

See also 

List of Arkansas Civil War Confederate units
Lists of American Civil War Regiments by State
Confederate Units by State
Arkansas in the American Civil War
Arkansas Militia in the Civil War

Units and formations of the Confederate States Army from Arkansas
1865 disestablishments in Arkansas
Military units and formations disestablished in 1865
Military units and formations in Arkansas
Military in Arkansas
1861 establishments in Arkansas
Military units and formations established in 1861